National Weather Service - North Little Rock, AR, also known as National Weather Service - Little Rock, AR, is a local weather forecast office responsible for monitoring weather conditions for 47 of Arkansas's 75 counties, excluding 7 counties in Northwestern Arkansas, 9 counties in Southwestern and South Central Arkansas, Ashley and Chicot counties in Extreme Southeastern Arkansas, and 14 counties in Eastern Arkansas. Those counties are monitored by the Weather Service offices in Tulsa, Shreveport, Jackson (MS), and Memphis respectively. The current office in North Little Rock maintains a WSR-88D (NEXRAD) radar system and Advanced Weather Interactive Processing System (AWIPS) that greatly improve forecasting in the region. North Little Rock is in charge of weather forecasts, warnings and local statements as well as aviation weather. The name of the Doppler radar (WSR-88D) code used by this office is LZK. The National Weather Service at North Little Rock, Arkansas programs 12 NOAA Weather Radio transmitters across Arkansas, with 25 transmitters statewide.

NWS NLR Team
Meteorologist-in-Charge (MIC) - James (Jim) Reynolds
Administrative Support Assistant (ASA) - Lori Dixon
Warning Coordination Meteorologist (WCM) - Dennis Cavanaugh 
Science and Operations Officer (SOO) - Christopher Buonanno
Electronic Systems Administrator (ESA) - Paul F. Siebenmorgen
Information Technology Officer (ITO) - Daniel J. Koch
Service Hydrologist - Tabitha Clarke
Observations Program Leader - Sean J. Clarke
5 Senior Forecasters
5 Journeymen Forecasters
3 Meteorological Interns
2 Electronics Technicians

NOAA Weather Radio Stations served by this office
KXI91 - Morrilton, 162.475 MHz
KXI92 - High Peak, 162.425 MHz
KXI96 - Russell-Russell Mtn., 162.400 MHz
KXI97 - Mena-Eagle Mtn., 162.400 MHz
WNG639 - Cherokee Village-Agnos, 162.475 MHz
WWF96 - Russellville, 162.525 MHz
WWG54 - Yellville-Rea Valley, 162.500 MHz
WXJ48 - Gurdon, 162.475 MHz
WXJ54 - Star City, 162.400 MHz
WXJ55 - Little Rock-Shinall Mtn., 162.500 MHz
WXL66 - Mountain View, 162.450 MHz
WXN92 - Harrison, 162.525 MHz

References

External links
Official Website

North Little Rock, Arkansas
North Little Rock, Arkansas